Tapiwa Kumbuyani (born 8 February 1983) is a retired Zimbabwean football defender.

References

1983 births
Living people
Zimbabwean footballers
Chapungu United F.C. players
Hwange Colliery F.C. players
Monomotapa United F.C. players
CAPS United players
How Mine F.C. players
Bantu Tshintsha Guluva Rovers F.C. players
Zimbabwe international footballers
Association football defenders
Sportspeople from Gweru
Zimbabwe Premier Soccer League players